Cyria Cristina Rocha Coentro (Salvador, April 14, 1966) is a Brazilian actress and presenter. She was known for participating in the telenovela Renascer (1993). She has performed in O Rei do Gado (1997) and other projects until being recognized for her performance in Viver a Vida (2009) and for starring in Flor do Caribe (2013) and Sete Vidas 2015). In the cinema she made appearances in the films Gonzaga - de Pai pra Filho (2012) and Time and the Wind (2013).

Career 
Cyria was born in Salvador, Bahia, on April 14, 1966. She started her television career at the age of 26 in the telenovela Renascer, screened by Rede Globo, and has since played a number of roles on the station where she continues to act. Among his novels are O Rei do Gado, Porto dos Milagres, Viver a Vida and others. Cyria emerged when making the telenovela Sete Vidas, by Lícia Manzo.

After participating in episodes of Você Decide (1993 and 1994), she entered the cast of O Rei do Gado (1997), also of Rede Globo, there she was the character Maria da Luz. In 1998 she was in the cast of Dona Flor e Seus Dois Maridos as Juliana, where she was part of a homosexual couple. In 2001, he made a guest appearance in the telenovela Porto dos Milagres as Flávia. Already in 2003 also made another participation in Mulheres Apaixonadas, by Manoel Carlos, as Roberta.

Filmography

Television

Cinema

In theater 
 Jingobel, directed by Cadú Fávero
 O Mágico de Oz – The Dark Side, directed by Cadú Fávero
 Coração Inquieto, directed by Sergio Módena
 Isso Assim Assado no Inferno, directed by Hebe Alves
 Los Catedrásticos, directed by Paulo Dourado
 Animal, directed by Celso Nunes

References

External links 

1966 births
Brazilian actresses
Living people